TV Burp was an Australian television comedy program which premiered on the Seven Network on 23 July 2009 hosted by Ed Kavalee.

The show presents a satirical look at the previous week's television, including extracts from TV shows with added sketches, observational voice-overs, and guest appearances.

The show was based on the original British award-winning TV series Harry Hill's TV Burp. The first season finished on Thursday 10 September 2009, with Seven hoping to bring it back some time in the near future, though the second series did not air in 2010.

Format
The show makes fun of TV shows from all Australian television networks, Ed Kavalee would introduce the show and attempt to make fun of the lines that are said on the TV show, or they'll even try to mock the acting on the said TV show. Generally, the TV shows which are mocked are either reality, drama or game shows, such as Home and Away and MasterChef Australia.

Reception

The first episode of TV Burp was widely watched, attracting an audience of 1.007 million people. The second episode did not rate as well, below 900,000 viewers. The third ranked even lower, rating under 775,000 viewers.

 ('-' detonates unknown)

References

External links

Seven Network original programming
2009 Australian television series debuts
2009 Australian television series endings
Australian television sketch shows